Trypethelium is a genus of lichenized fungi in the family Trypetheliaceae. The widespread genus contains about 50 species that are predominantly found in tropical areas. Trypethelium was circumscribed by German botanist Kurt Polycarp Joachim Sprengel in 1804.

Species

Trypethelium astroideum  – Bolivia
Trypethelium eluteriae 
Trypethelium epileucodes 
Trypethelium globolucidum 
Trypethelium infraeluteriae 
Trypethelium luteolucidum 
Trypethelium medians 
Trypethelium muriforme  – Brazil
Trypethelium papillosum 
Trypethelium tolimense 
Trypethelium variolosum 
Trypethelium xanthoplatystomum  – Bolivia

References

Trypetheliaceae
Dothideomycetes genera
Taxa named by Kurt Polycarp Joachim Sprengel
Taxa described in 1804